Amore! is a 1993 comedy film directed by Lorenzo Doumani and starring Jack Scalia and Kathy Ireland. Its music score was created by Harry Manfredini.

Plot

Saul Schwartz (played by Jack Scalia) is a bored New York businessman who decides to change his life to become a Hollywood movie star but finds it harder than he expected.

Cast 
 
 Jack Scalia as Saul Schwartz
 Kathy Ireland as Taylor Christopher 
 Katherine Helmond as Mildred Schwartz 
 Elliott Gould as George Levine 
 George Hamilton as Rudolpho Carbonera
 James Doohan as Dr. Landon 
 Frank Gorshin as Asino 
 Brenda Epperson as Louise Armstrong 
 Norm Crosby as Shlomo Schwartz 
 Betsy Russell as Cheryl Schwartz 
 Arlene Golonka as Acting Coach
 Mother Love as Cookie 
 Allan Rich as Studio Executive

References

External links
Amore! at the Internet Movie Database

1993 films
1993 comedy films
Films scored by Harry Manfredini
American comedy films
1990s English-language films
1990s American films